Arnebia decumbens (Ventenat) Cosson & Kralik is a plant in the family  Boraginaceae native to Europe and much of central and southeastern Asia. It is an annual herb with yellow flowers, growing on mountain slopes and sandy waste areas.

References

Boraginoideae
Flora of China